Lucy Kennedy (born 11 July 1988) is an Australian former racing cyclist, who last rode for UCI Women's WorldTeam .

A former triathlete, track and cross country runner, Kennedy was the recipient of the 2017 Amy Gillett Scholarship to do a European tour of races with the High5 Australian Development Team. She has degrees in Civil Engineering, and Commerce, working as a traffic modeller. Kennedy joined UCI Women's Team  for the 2018 season.

In August 2021 she announced that she would retire from professional cycling at the end of the season.

Major results

2016
 4th Time trial, Oceania Road Championships
2017
 Oceania Road Championships
1st  Time trial
3rd  Road race
 1st  Overall Tour de l'Ardèche
1st  Sprints classification
1st Stage 6
 3rd  Road race, National Road Championships
2018
 26th Taiwan KOM Challenge
 2nd  Time trial, National Road Championships
 4th Overall Women's Tour Down Under
 5th Strade Bianche
 9th Trofeo Alfredo Binda-Comune di Cittiglio
2019
 1st  Overall Women's Herald Sun Tour
1st  Mountains classification
1st Stage 2
1st Durango-Durango Emakumeen Saria
1st Donostia San Sebastian Klasikoa
 2nd Overall Women's Tour Down Under
 2nd Cadel Evans Great Ocean Road Race
 2nd Emakumeen Nafarroako Klasikoa
2020
 1st  Overall Women's Herald Sun Tour

References

External links

1988 births
Australian female cyclists
Living people
Cyclists from Brisbane
20th-century Australian women
21st-century Australian women